"The Wolves" is the debut single by British singer-songwriter Ben Howard, from his first studio album, Every Kingdom. The song was written by Howard and produced by Chris Bond. It is a re-recording of the original version found on the 2009 EP, These Waters. Released in the United Kingdom on 3 June 2011 as a digital download and on CD, the song entered the UK Singles Chart at number 97 and reached a peak chart position of number 70. The single's cover art was designed by Owen Tozer.

The single was re-released on 23 February 2012 containing one extra version of the song. 

The song finds Howard using fairy tale lyrics to lament about human nature.

Music video
A music video to accompany the release of "The Wolves" was released on YouTube on 22 June 2011 with a total length of three minutes and nineteen seconds. The video is also included on the deluxe edition of the studio album Every Kingdom.

Track listing

Chart performance

Certifications

Release History

References

2009 songs
2011 debut singles
Ben Howard songs
Island Records singles
Songs written by Ben Howard
Songs based on fairy tales
Songs about wolves